Chiromachla is a genus of tiger moths in the family Erebidae.

Species
Chiromachla chalcosidia Hampson, 1910
Chiromachla gracilis
Chiromachla insulare
Chiromachla leuconoe
Chiromachla pallescens
Chiromachla perspicua
Chiromachla restrictum
Chiromachla seychellensis
Chiromachla torbeni
Chiromachla transitella

References
Natural History Museum Lepidoptera generic names catalog

Nyctemerina
Moth genera